Magnolia is  an English name taken from the flower name.

The name has increased in popularity for girls in the United States in recent years. It came into popular use along with other plant and flower names in the late 1800s and early 1900s and was the 420th most popular name for girls in 1909, the height of its early use. It had declined in popularity by the mid 20th century but then returned to the top 1,000 names for newborn American girls in 2013 and was ranked among the top 200 names for girls by 2020.

People
Magnolia Maymuru (born 1997), Australian actress and model
Magnolia Thunderpussy, stage name of Patricia Mallon (1939-1996), American burlesque performer, radio personality, filmmaker and restaurateur from San Francisco, California.

Notes 

English feminine given names
Given names derived from plants or flowers